West Virginia's folk heritage is a part of the Appalachian folk music tradition, and includes styles of fiddling, ballad singing, and other styles that draw on Ulster-Scots music.

West Virginia consists of a mostly rural region, although its few relatively urban centers are prominent spots of musical innovation. The Capitol Music Hall, in Wheeling, is the oldest performing place of its kind in the state, and has hosted a wide variety of acts, from national tours to the local Wheeling Symphony Orchestra.

Other music institutions in West Virginia include the Mountaineer Opera House in Milton. The West Virginia Symphony Orchestra was founded in 1939, as the Charleston Civic Orchestra, before becoming the Charleston Symphony Orchestra in 1943. The first conductor was William R. Wiant, followed by the prominent conductor Antonio Modarelli, of the Wheeling Symphony Orchestra.

The town of Glenville has long been home to the annual West Virginia State Folk Festival.

Music history 

West Virginia's historical contributions to musical development include WWVA Jamboree, a radio show that began in 1933 and soon became a very prominent regional show, based out of the Capitol Music Hall in Wheeling. WWVA, the radio station that has long broadcast WWVA Jamboree, hosts the Jamboree in the Hills every July in St. Clairsville, Ohio, just across the border from Wheeling.

The town of Oak Hill was the site of country legend Hank Williams' death, which is commemorated by a plaque in front of the public library in Oak Hill.

Daniel Johnston, born in California, grew up in New Cumberland.

Music festivals

Notable musicians

References

West Virginia Music Hall of Fame
Brandon E. Davis

Notes

 
West Virginia culture
West Virginia
Appalachian music
West Virginia